Paint stripper, or paint remover, is a chemical product designed to remove paint, finishes, and coatings, while also cleaning the underlying surface. 

The product's material safety data sheet provides more safety information than its product labels.

Paint can also be removed using mechanical methods (scraping or sanding) or heat (hot air, radiant heat, or steam).

Types
Chemical paint removers work only on certain types of finishes, and when multiple types of finishes may have been used on any particular surface, trial-and-error testing is typical to determine the best stripper for each application. Two basic categories of chemical paint removers are caustic and solvent.

Caustics
Caustic paint removers, typically sodium hydroxide (also known as lye or caustic soda), work by breaking down the chemical bonds of the paint, usually by hydrolysis of the chain bonds of the polymers forming the paint. Caustic removers must be neutralized or the new finish will fail prematurely. In addition, several side effects and health risks must be taken into account in using caustic paint removers. Such caustic aqueous solutions are typically used by antique dealers who aim to restore old furniture by stripping off worn varnishes, for example.

Solvents
Solvent paint strippers penetrate the layers of paint and break the bond between the paint and the object by swelling the paint.

The active ingredient in the most effective paint strippers is dichloromethane, also called methylene chloride. Dichloromethane has serious health risks including death,  is likely a carcinogen, and is banned in some countries for consumer use. Despite this, deaths from dichloromethane are extremely rare at less than 2.4 cases per year and associated mostly with users applying large amounts in confined, poorly ventilated spaces. When applied in reasonable amounts and with typical levels of ventilation, or outdoors, it is generally safe to use.

Solvent strippers may also have formulations with limonene from orange peel (or other terpene solvents), n-methylpyrrolidone, esters such as dibasic esters (often dimethyl esters of shorter dicarboxylic acids, sometimes aminated, for example, adipic acid or glutamic acid), aromatic hydrocarbons, dimethylformamide, and other solvents are known as well. The formula differs according to the type of paint and the character of the underlying surface. Nitromethane is another commonly used solvent. Dimethyl sulfoxide is a less toxic alternative solvent used in some formulations. Unfortunately, these alternative stripping formulas are largely ineffective compared to those based on dichloromethane - removing only one layer at a time, or often no paint at all. When they do work they take hours, compared to minutes or seconds for dichloromethane-based strippers.

Paint strippers come in a liquid, or a gel ("thixotropic") form that clings even to vertical surfaces.

The principle of paint strippers is penetration of the paint film by the molecules of the active ingredient, causing it to swell; this volume increase causes internal strains, which, together with the weakening of the layer's adhesion to the underlying surface, leads to separation of the layer of the paint from the substrate.

Other components
Various co-solvents are added to the primary active ingredient. These assist with penetration into the paint and its removal and differ according to the target paint. Ethanol is suitable for shellac, methyl ethyl ketone is used for cellulose nitrate, and phenol and cresols are employed in some industrial formulas. Benzyl alcohol is used as well.

Activators increase the penetration rate; for dichloromethane water is suitable, other choices are amines, strong acids or strong alkalis. The activator's role is to disrupt the molecular and intermolecular bonds in the paint film and assist with weakening this. Its composition depends on the character of the paint to be removed. Mineral acids are used for epoxy resins to hydrolyze their ether bonds. Alkaline activators are usually based on sodium hydroxide. Some cosolvents double as activators. Amine activators, alkalines weaker than inorganic hydroxides, are favored when the substrate could be corroded by strong acids or bases.

Surfactants assist with wetting the surface, increasing the area of where the solvent can penetrate the paint layer. Anionic surfactants (e.g., dodecyl benzenesulfonate or sodium xylene sulfonate) are used for acidic formulas, cationic or non-ionic are suitable for alkaline formulas.
Paint strippers containing surfactants are excellent brush cleaners.

Thickeners are used for thixotropic formulas to help the mixture form gel that adheres to vertical surfaces and to reduce the evaporation of the solvents, thus prolonging the time the solvent can penetrate the paint. Cellulose-based agents, e.g., hydroxypropyl cellulose, are commonly used for mixtures that are not extremely acidic or basic; under such conditions cellulose undergoes hydrolysis and loses effectiveness, so fumed silica is used for these instead. Another possibility is using waxes (usually paraffin wax or polyethylene or polypropylene derivatives), or polyacrylate gels.

Corrosion inhibitors are added to the formula to protect the underlying substrate and the paint stripper storage vessel (usually a steel can) from corrosion. Dichloromethane decomposes with time to hydrochloric acid, which readily reacts with propylene oxide or butylene oxide and therefore is removed from the solution. Chromate-based inhibitors give the mixture a characteristic yellow color. Other possibilities include polyphosphates, silicates, borates, and various antioxidants.

Sequestrants and chelating agents are used to "disarm" metal ions present in the solution, which could otherwise reduce the efficiency of other components, and assist with cleaning stains, which often contain metal compounds. The most common sequestrants used in paint strippers are EDTA, tributyl phosphate, and sodium phosphate.

Colorants may be added.

Alternatives
Heat guns are an alternative to chemical paint strippers. When heated, softened paint clumps and is easier to contain. Fire is a possible hazard of using heat guns.

Steam can be used on large surfaces or items to be stripped, such as window sash, can be placed inside a steam box.

Local laws
Lead-based paint is banned in the United States. Removing old lead-based paint can disperse lead and cause lead poisoning, leading several US workplace and environmental regulations address removal of old paint that could contain lead.

See also
Distressing
Nitromors

References

External links
JAIC 1993: The composition of proprietary paint strippers
Old-House Journal article on paint removers starts on page 58
"Urban Expression", a paper on the history of NYC graffiti.
"How To Use Paint Stripper", an explanation on usage of paint strippers

Household chemicals
Industrial processes
Painting materials
Woodworking